Batman Returns is a 1992 American superhero film directed by Tim Burton and written by Daniel Waters. Based on the DC Comics character Batman, it is the sequel to Batman (1989) and the second installment in the 1989–1997 Batman series. In the film, the superhero vigilante Batman comes into conflict with wealthy industrialist Max Shreck and deformed crime boss Oswald Cobbleplot / The Penguin, who seek power, influence, and respect regardless of the cost to Gotham City. Their plans are complicated by Selina Kyle, Shreck's formerly-meek secretary, who seeks vengeance against Shreck as Catwoman. The cast includes Michael Keaton, Danny DeVito, Michelle Pfeiffer, Christopher Walken, Michael Gough, Pat Hingle, and Michael Murphy.

Burton had no interest in making a sequel to the successful Batman, believing that he was creatively restricted by the expectations of Warner Bros. He agreed to return in exchange for significant creative control, including replacing original writer Sam Hamm with Daniel Waters and hiring many of his previous creative collaborators. Waters' script focused more on characterization than on overarching plot, and Wesley Strick was hired to complete an uncredited re-write which (among other elements) provided a master plan for the Penguin. Filming was done from September 1991 to February 1992, on a $50–80million budget, on sets and sound stages at Warner Bros. Studios and the Universal Studios Lot in California. Special effects primarily involved practical applications and makeup, with some animatronics and computer-generated imagery.

The film's marketing campaign was substantial, including brand collaborations and a variety of merchandise to replicate Batman success. Released on June 19, 1992, Batman Returns broke several box-office records and earned about $266.8million worldwide. It failed to replicate the success or longevity of Batman ($411.6million), however; this was blamed on its darker tone and violent (or sexual) elements, which alienated family audiences and led to a backlash against marketing partnerssuch as McDonald'sfor promoting the film to young children. Reviews were critical of its tone and narrative but more favorable towards the cast, giving near-unanimous praise to Pfeiffer's performance.

After the relative failure of Batman Returns, Burton was replaced as director of the third film, Batman Forever (1995), with Joel Schumacher, to take the series in a family-friendly direction. Keaton chose not to reprise his role, disagreeing with Schumacher's vision. Batman Forever and its sequel, Batman & Robin (1997), fared less well critically, the latter being considered one of the worst superhero films ever made and stalled the Batman film franchise until the series reboot, Batman Begins (2005). Batman Returns has been reassessed as one of the best Batman films in the decades since its release, and its incarnations of Catwoman and Penguin are considered iconic. A comic book, Batman '89 (2021), continued the narrative of the original two Burton films and Keaton will reprise his version of Batman in the DC Extended Universe film The Flash.

Plot 

In Gotham City, two wealthy socialites, dismayed at the birth of their malformed and feral son Oswald, discard the infant in the sewers, where he is adopted by a family of penguins. Thirty-three years later, during the Christmas season, wealthy industrialist Max Shreck is abducted by the Red Triangle gang (a group of former circus workers connected to child disappearances across the country) and brought to their hideout in the Arctic exhibit at the derelict Gotham Zoo. Red Triangle's leader, Oswald – now named Penguin – blackmails Shreck with evidence of his corruption and murderous acts to compel his assistance in reintegrating Oswald into Gotham's elite. Shreck orchestrates a staged attempted kidnapping attempt of the mayor's infant child, allowing Oswald to rescue it and become a public hero. In exchange, Oswald requests access to the city's birth records (ostensibly to learn his true identity) and identifies Gotham's first-born sons.

Shreck attempts to kill his meek secretary, Selina Kyle, by pushing her out a window after she inadvertently uncovers his plot to build a power plant which would covertly siphon and hoard electricity from Gotham. Selina survives, returns home, angrily crafts a costume and adopts the name Catwoman. She returns to work confident and aggressive, catching the attention of visiting billionaire Bruce Wayne. As his alter ego (the vigilante Batman), Wayne investigates Oswald, suspecting that he is connected to Red Triangle. To eliminate opposition to his plant, Shreck convinces Oswald to run for mayor and discredit the incumbent by having Red Triangle wreak havoc throughout Gotham. Batman's efforts to stop the gang eventually bring him into conflict with Catwoman. Selina and Wayne begin dating, while Catwoman allies with Oswald to disgrace Batman.

On the night of the city's Christmas-tree lighting, Oswald and Catwoman kidnap the Ice Princess (Gotham's beauty queen) and lure Batman to the roof above the ceremony. Oswald pushes the Ice Princess to her death with a swarm of bats, framing Batman. When Catwoman objects to the murder and rejects his romantic advances, Oswald attacks her and she falls through a glasshouse. Batman escapes in the Batmobile, unaware that Red Triangle has modified it; this allows Oswald to take it on a remote-controlled rampage. Before regaining control, Batman records Oswald's derogatory tirade against Gotham's citizens. He plays the audio at Oswald's mayoral rally the following day, ruining his image and forcing him to retreat to Gotham Zoo. Oswald forsakes his humanity and embraces the name Penguin, initiating his plan to abduct and kill Gotham's firstborn sons to avenge his own abandonment.

Selina tries to kill Shreck at his charity ball, but Wayne intervenes and they inadvertently discovers each other's secret identities. Penguin crashes the event to kidnap Shreck's son, Chip, but Shreck offers himself instead. Batman neutralizes Red Triangle and stops the kidnapping, forcing Penguin to deploy his missile-equipped penguin army to destroy Gotham. Batman's butler, Alfred Pennyworth, overrides the penguins' control signal and redirects them back to Gotham Zoo. As the missiles destroy the zoo, Batman unleashes a swarm of bats which makes Penguin fall into the contaminated waters of the Arctic exhibit. Catwoman arrives to kill Shreck, rejecting Batman's plea to abandon her vengeance and leave with him. She is shot four times by Shreck, seemingly without effect, because she claims to have two of her nine lives remaining. Catwoman electrocutes Shreck, causing a power surge which apparently kills them both; however, Batman finds only Shreck's charred remains. Penguin returns, but dies of his injuries before he can attack Batman and is laid to rest in the water by his penguins. Sometime later, while Alfred drives him home, Wayne sees Selina's silhouette but finds only a cat (which he takes with him). The Bat-Signal shines above the city, as Catwoman looks on.

Cast

 Michael Keaton as Bruce Wayne / Batman: A billionaire businessman who operates as Gotham's vigilante protector
 Danny DeVito as Oswald Cobblepot / Penguin: A deformed crime boss
 Michelle Pfeiffer as Selina Kyle / Catwoman: A meek assistant turned vengeful villain
 Christopher Walken as Max Shreck: A ruthless industrialist
 Michael Gough as Alfred Pennyworth: Wayne's butler and surrogate father
 Pat Hingle as James Gordon: The Gotham City police commissioner and Batman's ally
 Michael Murphy as the Mayor:  The city's incumbent mayor

The cast of Batman Returns includes Andrew Bryniarski as Max's son Charles "Chip" Schreck and Cristi Conaway as the Ice Princess, Gotham's beauty queen-elect. Paul Reubens and Diane Salinger appear as Tucker and Esther Cobblepot, Oswald's wealthy, elite parents. Sean Whalen appears as a paperboy; Jan Hooks and Steve Witting play Jen and Josh, Oswald's mayoral image consultants. The Red Triangle gang includes the monkey-toting Organ Grinder (Vincent Schiavelli), the Poodle Lady (Anna Katarina), the Tattooed Strongman (Rick Zumwalt), the Sword Swallower (John Strong), the Knifethrower Dame (Erika Andersch), the Acrobatic Thug (Gregory Scott Cummins), the Terrifying Clown (Branscombe Richmond), the Fat Clown (Travis Mckenna), and the Thin Clown (Doug Jones).

Production

Development

After the success of Batman (1989), the fifth-highest-grossing of its time, a sequel was considered inevitable. Warner Bros. Pictures had confidence in its potential and was discussing sequel ideas by late 1989, intending to begin filming the following May; the studio had purchased the $2million Gotham City sets at Pinewood Studios in England for at least two sequels. It kept the sets under 24-hour guard because it was cheaper to maintain the existing sets than build new ones. Robin Williams and Danny DeVito were considered to play rogues Riddler and Penguin, respectively. Despite pressure from Warner Bros. to finalize a script and begin filming, Batman director Tim Burton remained uncertain about directing a sequel. He described it as a "dumbfounded idea", especially before Batmans performance was analyzed, and was generally opposed to sequels: "Sequels are only worthwhile if they give you the opportunity to do something new and interesting. It has to go beyond that, really, because you do the first for the thrill of the unknown. A sequel wipes all that out, so you must explore the next level." 
Batman writer Sam Hamm's initial story idea expanded the character of district attorney Harvey Dent, played in Batman by Billy Dee Williams, and his descent into the supervillain Two-Face. Warner Bros. wanted the main villain to be the Penguin, however, and Hamm believed that the studio saw the character as Batman's most prominent enemy after the Joker. Catwoman was added because Burton and Hamm were interested in the character. Hamm's drafts continued directly from Batman, focusing on the relationship between Wayne and Vicki Vale (Kim Basinger) and their engagement. The Penguin was written as an avian-themed criminal who uses birds as weapons; Catwoman was more overtly sexualised, wore "bondage" gear, and nonchalantly murdered groups of men. The main narrative teamed Penguin and Catwoman to frame Batman for the murders of Gotham's wealthiest citizens in their pursuit of a secret treasure. Their quest leads them to Wayne Manor, and reveals the Waynes' secret history. Among other things, Hamm originated the Christmastime setting and introduced Robin, Batman's sidekick, although his idea for assault rifle-wielding Santas was abandoned. Hamm ensured that Batman did not kill anyone, and focused on protecting Gotham's homeless. He produced two drafts which failed to renew Burton's interest, and the director concentrated on directing Edward Scissorhands (1990) and writing The Nightmare Before Christmas (1993).

Burton was confirmed to direct the sequel in January 1991, with filming scheduled to begin later that year for a 1992 release date. He agreed to return if he received creative control of the sequel; Burton considered Batman the least favorite of his films, describing it as a "little boring at times." According to Denise Di Novi, his long-time producer, "Only about 50% of Batman was [Burton]"; the studio wanted Batman Returns to be "more of a Tim Burton movie... [a] weirder movie but also more hip and fun."

Burton replaced key Batman crew with some of his former collaborators, including cinematographer Stefan Czapsky, production designer Bo Welch, creature-effects supervisor Stan Winston, makeup artist Ve Neill, and art directors Tom Duffield and Rick Henrichs. Daniel Waters was hired to replace Hamm; Burton wanted someone with no emotional attachment to Batman and liked Waters' script for the dark comedy Heathers (1988), which matched Burton's intended tone and creative direction. Burton reportedly disliked Batman producer Jon Peters, demoted him to executive producer of Batman Returns, and effectively barred him from the set. Warner Bros. was the production company and distributor, with production assistance from executive producer Peter Guber's and Peters' Polygram Pictures.

Writing

Waters began writing his first draft in mid-1990. Burton's only instructions were that Catwoman had to be more than a "sexy vixen", and the script's only connection to Batman was a reference to Vale as Wayne's ex-girlfriend. Waters said that he did not like Batman, and had no interest in following its narrative threads or acknowledging the comic-book histories of Batman Returns characters: "[Burton] and I never had a conversation about 'what are fans of the comic books going to think?'... we never thought about them. We were really just about the art." He also had no interest in preventing Batman from killing people; the character should reflect contemporary, "darker" times, and the idea of a hero leaving captured villains for the authorities was outdated. Waters only had Batman kill when necessary, however, believing that it should be meaningful; he was unhappy with some of the added on-screen deaths, such as Batman blowing up a Red Triangle member with a bomb.

Much of Waters' "bitter and cynical" dialogue for Batman (such as Gotham City not deserving protection) was removed because Keaton believed that Batman should rarely speak in costume and Burton wanted Batman to be a "wounded soul," not nihilistic. As a result, the script focused on villains. Burton said that he initially struggled to understand the appeal of the Penguin's comic-book counterpart; Batman, Catwoman, and the Joker had clear psychological profiles, but the Penguin was "just this guy with a cigarette and a top hat." The initial draft made the character resemble a stereotypical DeVito character (an abrasive gangster), but Waters and Burton agreed to make him more "animalistic." They decided to make the Penguin a tragic figure, abandoned as an infant by his parentsa reflection of Batman's childhood trauma of losing his parents. Political and social satire was added, influenced by two episodes of the 1960s television series Batman ("Hizzoner the Penguin" and "Dizhonner the Penguin") in which the Penguin runs for mayor.

Waters changed Hamm's Catwoman from a "fetishy sexual fantasy" femme fatale to a working-class, disenchanted secretary, writing her as an allegory of contemporary feminism. Although the character is influenced by feline mythology (such as cats having nine lives), Waters and Burton never intended the belief to be taken literally and planned for Catwoman to die with Shreck during the electrical explosion in the film's denouement. Waters created Max Shreck as an original character, named in honor of actor Max Schreck, to replace the Dent-Two-Face character. The character was written satirically as an evil industrialist who orchestrates the Penguin's mayoral run because Waters wanted to say "that the true villains of our world don't necessarily wear costumes." In one version of the script, Shreck was the Penguin's more-favored brother. The number of central characters led to the removal of Robin, a garage mechanic who helps Batman after Penguin crashes the Batmobile. Burton and Waters were not particularly interested in retaining the character, whom Waters called "the most worthless character in the world." The Red Triangle gang, initially conceived as a troupe of performance artists, were changed to circus clowns at Burton's request. Waters said that his 160-page first draft was too outlandish and would have cost $400million to produce, and he became more restrained. His fifth (and final draft) focused more on characterization and interaction than on plot.

Burton and Waters eventually fell out, disagreeing about the script and with Waters refusing to implement requested changes. Burton hired Wesley Strick to refine Waters' work, streamline dialogue, and lighten the tone. Warner Bros. executives mandated that Strick introduce a master plan for the Penguin, resulting in the addition of the plot to kidnap Gotham's first-born sons and threaten the city with missiles. Waters said that the changes to his work were relatively minor, and he was baffled by the Penguin's plot: "What the fuck is this shit?" He made a final revision to the shooting screenplay and, although Strick was on set for four months of filming and agreed-upon rewriting, Waters was the only screenwriter credited.

Casting

Keaton reprised his role as Bruce Wayne / Batman for double his $5million salary for Batman. Burton wanted to cast Marlon Brando as the Penguin, but Warner Bros. preferred Dustin Hoffman. Christopher Lloyd and Robert De Niro were also considered, but Danny DeVito became the frontrunner when Waters re-envisioned the character as a deformed human-bird hybrid. DeVito was initially reluctant to accept the role until he was convinced by his close friend, Jack Nicholson, who played the Joker in Batman. To convey his vision, Burton gave DeVito a picture he had painted of a diminutive character sitting on a red-and-white striped ball with the caption, "my name is Jimmy, but my friends call me the hideous penguin boy."

Casting Selina Kyle / Catwoman was difficult. Annette Bening initially secured the role, but had to drop out after becoming pregnant. Actresses lobbying for the part then included Ellen Barkin, Cher, Bridget Fonda, Jennifer Jason Leigh, Madonna, Julie Newmar, Lena Olin, Susan Sarandon, Raquel Welch, and Basinger. The most prominent candidate, however, was Sean Young (who was cast as Vale in Batman before she was injured). Young went to the Warner Bros. lot in a homemade Catwoman costume for an impromptu audition for Burton, who reportedly hid under his desk (although Keaton and producer Mark Canton briefly met with her). She shared video of her efforts with Entertainment Tonight, and Warner Bros. said that Young did not fit their vision for Catwoman.

The role went to Pfeiffer who was described as a proven actress who got along with Burton (although some publications said that it would stretch her acting abilities). Pfeiffer had also been considered for Vale, but Keaton vetoed the casting because they had been romantically involved and he believed that her presence would interfere with attempts to reconcile with his wife. She received a $3million salary ($2million more than Bening), plus a percentage of the gross profits. Pfeiffer trained for months in kickboxing with her stunt double, Kathy Long; she mastered the whip, becoming proficient enough to perform her own stunts with the weapon.

Shreck's appearance was modeled on Vincent Price in an (unnamed) older film, and Walken based his performance on moguls such as Sol Hurok and Samuel Goldwyn. He said, "I tend to play mostly villains and twisted people. Unsavory guys. I think it's my face, the way I look. If you do something effective, producers want you to do it again and again." Burgess Meredith (who played the Penguin in the 1960s TV series) was scheduled to make a cameo appearance as Penguin's father, Tucker Cobblepot, but became ill during filming. He was replaced by Paul Reubens; Diane Salinger played his wife, Esther. Both had starred in Burton's feature-film debut, Pee-wee's Big Adventure (1985).

Although Robin was removed from the screenplay, the character's development was far enough along that Marlon Wayans was cast in the role (Burton had specifically wanted an African-American Robin) and costumes, sets, and action figures were made. In a 1998 interview, Wayans said that he still received residual checks as part of the two-film contract he signed. Early reports suggested that Nicholson had been asked to return as the Joker, but refused to film in England because of the salary tax on foreign talent. Nicholson denied being asked, however, believing that Warner Bros. would not want to replicate his generous compensation for Batman.

Filming

Principal photography began on September 3, 1991. Burton wanted to film in the United States with American actors because he believed that Batman "suffered from a British subtext." The economics of filming Batman in the United Kingdom had also changed, making it more cost-effective to remain in the U.S. This meant abandoning the English Batman sets in favor of Burton's new design. Batman Returns was filmed entirely on seven or eight soundstages at Warner Bros. Studios, Burbank, California, including Stage 16 (which housed the expansive Gotham Plaza set). An additional soundstage, Stage 12 at the Universal Studios Lot, was used for the Penguin's Arctic-exhibit lair.

Some sets were kept very cold for the live Emperor, black-footed, and King penguins. The birds were flown in on a refrigerated airplane for filming, and had a refrigerated waiting area with a swimming pool stocked with half a ton of ice daily and fresh fish. DeVito said that he generally liked being on set but disliked the cold conditions, and was the only person somewhat comfortable because of his costume's heavy padding. To create the penguin army, the live penguins were supplemented with puppets, forty Emperor-penguin suits worn by little people, and Computer-generated imagery (CGI). People for the Ethical Treatment of Animals (PETA) protested the use of real penguins, objecting to the birds' being moved from their natural environment. Although the organization had reportedly said that the penguins were not mistreated during filming, it later said that the birds did not get fresh drinking waterjust a small, chlorinated pool. PETA also objected to the penguins being fitted with appliances representing weapons and gadgets, which Warner Bros. said were lightweight plastic. Burton said that he did not like using real animals because he had an affinity for them, and ensured that the penguins were treated with care.

Walken described the filming as very collaborative, recalling that his suggestion to add a blueprint for Shreck's power plant resulted in a model built within a few hours. The scene of Catwoman putting a live bird in her mouth was real, with no CGI. Pfeiffer said that, in retrospect, she would not have done the stunt; she had not considered the risks of injury or disease involved. For a scene in Penguin's mayoral office, monkey handlers positioned above and below managed the organ grinder monkey as it descended a set of stairs with a note for Penguin. When it saw DeVito in full costume and makeup, it leapt at his testicles. DeVito said, "The monkey looked at me, froze, and then leapt right at my balls...Thank god it was a padded costume." A scene of Shreck's superstore exploding caused minor injuries to four stuntmen. Principal photography ended on February 20, 1992, after 170 days.

Post-production
Chris Lebenzon edited Batman Returns 126-minute theatrical cut. The final scene of Catwoman looking up at the Bat Signal was filmed during post-production, only two weeks before the film's release. Warner Bros. mandated the scene (depicting that the character survived) after test audiences responded positively to Pfeiffer's performance. Pfeiffer was unavailable to film the scene, and a stand-in was used. A scene of Penguin's gang destroying a store filled with Batman merchandise was removed. Warner Bros. provided a final budget for Batman Returns of $55million, although it has been reported (or estimated) as $50, $65, $75, or 80million.

Music

Danny Elfman was initially reluctant to score Batman Returns because he was unhappy that his Batman score was supplemented with pop music by Prince. Elfman built on many of his Batman themes, and said that he enjoyed working on the Penguin's themes the most because of the character's sympathetic aspects (such as his abandonment and death): "I'm a huge sucker for that kind of sentimentality." Recorded with a studio orchestra on the Sony Scoring Stage in Los Angeles, Elfman's score includes vocals, harps, bells, xylophones, flutes, pianos, and chimes. The song "Face to Face", played during the costume-ball scene, was co-written and performed by the British rock band Siouxsie and the Banshees. Burton and Elfman fell out during production due to the stress of finishing Batman Returns on time, but reconciled shortly afterward.

Design and effects
Batman production designer Anton Furst was replaced by Bo Welch, who understood Burton's visual intentions after previous collaborations on Beetlejuice (1988) and Edward Scissorhands (1990). Furst, already occupied on another project, committed suicide in November 1991. Warner Bros. maintained a high level of security for Batman Returns, requiring the art department to keep their window blinds closed. Cast and crew had to wear ID badges with the film's working title, Dictel, a word coined by Welch and Burton meaning "dictatorial"; they were unhappy with the studio's "ridiculous gestapo" measures. Welch designed the Batboat vehicle, a programmable batarang, and the Penguin's weaponized umbrellas. He added features to the Batmobile, such as detaching much of its exterior to fit through tighter spaces; this version was called the "Batmissile."

Sets
The sets were redesigned in Welch's style, including the Batcave and Wayne Manor. They were spread across seven soundstages on the Warner Bros. lot (the largest of which had  ceilings) and the largest set owned by Universal Pictures. Batman Returns was filmed on sets, although some panoramic shots (such as the camera traveling from the base of Shreck's department store to its cat-head-shaped office) were created with detailed miniatures.

Welch found it difficult to create something new without deviating from Furst's award-winning work. The designs were intended to appear as a separate district of Gotham; if Batman took place on the East Side, Batman Returns was set on the West Side. Welch was influenced by German Expressionism, neo-fascist architecture (including Nazi Germany-era styles), American precisionism painters, and photos of the homeless living on the streets in affluent areas. He incorporated Burton's rough sketch of Catwoman, which had a "very S&M kind of look," by adding chains and steel elements which would appear to hold together a city on the verge of collapse. The key element for Welch came early in design, when he realized that he wanted to manipulate spaces to convey specific emotions (emphasizing vertical buildings to convey a "huge, overwhelmingly corrupt, decaying city" filled with small people): "The film is about this alienating, disparate world we live in." The wintertime setting took advantage of the contrast between black and white scene elements, influenced by Citizen Kane (1941) and The Third Man (1949).

Welch's concept designs began by carving out building shapes from cardboard with images of fascist sculptures and depression era machine-age art. The resulting -tall rough model represented Gotham Plaza, described as a futuristic, oppressive, and "demented caricature" of Rockefeller Center. It was designed overbuilt, emphasizing the generic-but-oppressive heart of Gotham's corruption. Despite complaints from the film's financiers about its necessity, Burton insisted on the location with a detailed church overshadowed by plain surroundings.

Designs attempted to create the illusion of space; the Wayne Manor set was partially built (consisting primarily of a large staircase and fireplace) with a scale which implied that the rest of the structure was massive. A -tall Universal stage was acquired for the production, its raised ceilings making it seem more realistic and less like a set. Minor modifications were made to the set throughout the film to make it appear to be gradually deteriorating. Selina Kyle's apartment had a large steel beam running through its center to appear as if it had been built around a steel girder, which Welch said made it depressing and ironic. The wood used to build the sets was donated to Habitat for Humanity to help build low-cost homes for the poor.

Costumes and makeup

Bob Ringwood and Mary E. Vogt were the costume designers. They refined the Batsuit to create the illusion of mechanical parts built into the torso, intending Batman to resemble Darth Vader. Forty-eight foam-rubber Batsuits were made for Batman Returns. They had a mechanical system of bolts and spikes beneath the breast plate to secure the cowl and cape because "otherwise, if [Keaton] turned around quickly the cape would stay where it was", due to its weight. Costumer Paul Barrett-Brown said that the suit had a "generous codpiece" for comfort, and initially included a zippered fly to allow Keaton to use the bathroom; the actor declined, however, because it could be seen by the camera from some angles. As with the Batman costume, Keaton could not turn his head; he compensated by making bolder, more powerful movements with his lower body.

The Catwoman outfit was made from latex because it was designed to be "black and sexy and tight and shiny." The material was chosen because of its association with "erotic and sexual" situations, reflecting the character's transition from a repressed secretary to an extroverted, erotic female. Padding was added because Pfeiffer was less physically endowed than Bening; this worked to Pfeiffer's advantage, however, since Barrett-Brown said that if it was too tight it "would reveal the genital area so thoroughly that you'd get an X certificate." Ringwood and Vogt thought that if the latex material tore it would not be difficult to repair; forty to seventy backup Catwoman suits were made by Western Costume, the Warner Bros. costume department, and Los Angeles-based clothing manufacturer Syren at a cost of $1,000 each. Other versions, made for Pfeiffer from a cast of her body, were so tight that she had to be covered in baby powder to wear them. Barrett-Brown said that because of the material, it was possible to get into the suit when dry; they could not re-use them, however, because of sweat and body oils. Vin Burnham constructed Catwoman's headpiece and mask.

Burton was influenced to add stitching by calico cats, but the stitching came apart. Ringwood and Vogt struggled with adding stitching to latex. They tried to sculpt stitching and glue it on, but did not like the look and went over the suit with liquid silicon while it was worn (which added a shine to everything). Pfeiffer said that the suit was like a second skin, but when worn for long periods it was uncomfortable; there was no way to use the restroom and it would stick to her skin, occasionally causing a rash. She found the mask similarly confining, describing it as choking her or "smashing my face," and would catch the claws on nearby objects.

Stan Winston Studio created an "over-the-top Burtonesque" visual for the Penguin, without obscuring DeVito's face. Concept artist Mark McCreery drew a number of sketches for the look, from which Legacy Effects built noses on a lifecast of DeVito's face. Winston was unhappy with the "pointy nose" shapes and began sculpting ideas with clay, influenced by his work on The Wiz (1978) (which involved a forehead and brow prosthetic appliance for large-beaked creatures). The final makeup included a T-shaped appliance which went over DeVito's noise, lip and brow as well as crooked teeth, whitened skin and dark circles under his eyes. Ve Neill applied the makeup, made by John Rosengrant and Shane Mahan. The several pounds of facial prosthetics, body padding, and prosthetic hands took four-and-a-half hours to apply to DeVito, but was reduced to three hours by the end of filming. An air bladder was added to the costume to help reduce its weight. DeVito helped create the Penguin's black saliva with the makeup and effects teams, using a mild mouthwash and food coloring which he squirted into his mouth before filming, and said its taste was acceptable. Burton described DeVito as completely in-character in costume, and he "scared everybody." While re-dubbing some of his dialogue, DeVito struggled to get into character without the makeup and had it applied to improve his performance. Because of the secrecy surrounding his character's appearance before marketing, DeVito was not allowed to discuss it with others (including his family). A photo leaked to the press, and Warner Bros. employed a firm of private investigators in a failed attempt to track down the source.

Penguins
Stan Winston Studio provided animatronic penguins and costumes to supplement Penguin's army. Thirty animatronic versions were made: ten each of the  black-footed,  King, and  Emperor penguins. Costumes worn by little people were slightly larger than the animatronics; the actors controlled walking, the mechanized heads were remote-controlled and the wings were puppeteered. Dyed black chicken feathers were used for the penguin bodies. McCreery's designs for the penguin army initially included a flamethrower, which was replaced with a rocket launcher. Mechanical-effects designers Richard Landon and Craig Caton-Largent supervised the manufacture of the animatronics, which required nearly 200 different mechanical parts to control the head, neck, eyes, beak, and wings. Boss Film Studios produced the CGI penguins.

Release

Context

By the theatrical summer of 1992 (beginning the last week of May), the film industry was struggling. Ticket sales were their lowest in fifteen years; rising film-production costs and several box-office failures the previous year meant that many independent and some major film studios were struggling financially. Eighty-nine films were scheduled for release during the summer season, including A League of Their Own, Alien 3, Encino Man, Far and Away, Patriot Games, and Sister Act. Studios had to carefully schedule their releases to avoid competition from anticipated blockbusters, which included Lethal Weapon 3, Batman Returns, and the 1992 Summer Olympics. Batman Returns was predicted to be the summer's biggest success, and other studios were reportedly concerned about releasing their films within a few weeks of its premiere. Paramount Pictures increased the budget of Patriot Games from $29million to $43million to make it more competitive with Batman Returns and Lethal Weapon 3.

Marketing
Franchising had not been considered an important aspect of Batmans release. However, after merchandise contributed about $500million to its $1.5billion total earnings, it was prioritized for Batman Returns. Warner Bros. delayed major promotion until February 1992, to avoid over-saturation and the risk of driving away audiences. A 12-minute promotional reel which debuted at WorldCon in September 1991 with a black-and-white poster of a silhouetted Batman was called "mundane" and uninspiring. A trailer was released in 5,000 theaters in February 1992 with a new poster of a snow-swept Batman logo. The campaign focused on the three central characters (Batman, Penguin, and Catwoman), which Warner Bros. believed would offset the loss of the popular Nicholson. Over two-thirds of the 300 posters Warner Bros. installed in public places were stolen. Warner Bros. eventually offered 200 limited-edition posters for $250; they were signed by Keaton, who donated his earnings to charity.

Over $100million was expected to be spent on marketing, including $20million by Warner Bros. for commercials and trailers and $60million by merchandising partners. The partners, which included McDonald's, Ralston Purina, Kmart, Target Corporation, Venture Stores, and Sears, planned to host about 300 Batman shops in its stores. McDonald's converted 9,000 outlets into Gotham City restaurants, offering Batman-themed packaging and a cup lid which doubled as a flying disc. CBS aired a television special, The Bat, The Cat, The Penguin... Batman Returns, and Choice Hotels sponsored the hour-long The Making of Batman Returns. Television advertisements featured Batman and Catwoman fighting over a can of Diet Coke, and the Penguin (and his penguins) promoted Choice Hotels. Advertisements also appeared on billboards and in print (three consecutive pages in some newspapers), targeted at older audiences.

Box office
Batman Returns premiered on June 16, 1992, at Grauman's Chinese Theatre in Hollywood. Two blocks of Hollywood Boulevard were closed for over 3,000 fans, 33 TV film crews, and 100 photographers. A party was held afterwards on the Soundstage 16 Gotham Plaza set for guests who included Keaton, Pfeiffer, DeVito, Burton, DiNovi, Arnold Schwarzenegger, Faye Dunaway, James Caan, Mickey Rooney, Harvey Keitel, Christian Slater, James Woods, and Reubens.

The film had a limited, preview release in the U.S. and Canada on Thursday, June 18, earning $2million. It had a wide release the following day, and was shown on an above-average 3,000 screens in 2,644 theaters. Batman Returns earned $45.7million during its opening weekend (an average of $17,729 per theater), and was the number-one filmahead of Sister Act fourth weekend ($7.8million) and Patriot Games third ($7.7million). This figure broke the record for the highest-grossing opening weekend, set by Batman ($42.7million); Batman Returns had the highest-grossing opening weekend of the year, surpassing Lethal Weapon 3 ($33.2million). The film held the all-time record for the biggest opening weekend until it was surpassed by Jurassic Park ($50.1million) the next year. Performance analysis suggested that Batman Returns could become one of the all-time highest-grossing films; Warner Bros. executive Robert Friedman said, "We opened it the first real weekend when kids are out of school. The audience is everybody, but the engine that drives the charge are kids under 20." According to Patriot Games producer Mace Neufeld, other films benefited from overflow audiences for Batman Returns who did not want to wait in long lines or were turned away from sold-out screenings.

Batman Returns earned $25.4million in its second weekend (a 44.3-percent drop) and was the number-one film again, ahead of the premiering Unlawful Entry ($10.1million) and Sister Act ($7.2million). By the film's third weekend, it was the second=fastest film to gross $100million (11 days), behind Batman (10 days). It remained the number-one film with a gross of $13.8million (a 45.6-percent drop), ahead of the premiering A League of Their Own ($13.7million) and Boomerang ($13.6million). The Washington Post called its week-over-week drops "troublesome," and industry analysis suggested that Batman Returns would not replicate the longevity of Batmans theatrical run. It never regained the number-one position, falling to numberfour over its fourth weekend and leaving the top-ten highest-grossing films by its seventh. The film left theaters in late October after 18 weeks, with a total gross of $162.8million. It was the third-highest-grossing film of 1992, behind Home Alone 2: Lost in New York ($173.6million) and Aladdin ($217.3million).

Batman Returns earned an estimated $104million outside the U.S. and Canada, including a record-setting £2.8million opening weekend in the United Kingdom. This broke the record set by Terminator 2: Judgment Day (1991), making it the first film to gross more than £1million in a single day. Worldwide, Batman Returns grossed $266.8million. It was the sixth-highest-grossing film of 1992, behind Lethal Weapon 3 ($321.7million), Basic Instinct ($352.9million), Home Alone 2: Lost in New York ($359million), The Bodyguard ($410.9million), and Aladdin ($504.1million).

Reception

Critical response

Batman Returns had a polarized reception from professional critics. Audiences polled by CinemaScore gave the film an average grade of B on an A+-to-F scale.

Several reviewers compared Batman Returns and Batman; some suggested that the sequel had faster pacing and more comedy and depth, avoiding Batman "dourness" and "tedium". Critics generally agreed that Burton's creative control made Batman Returns a more personal work than Batman, something "fearlessly" different which could be judged on its own merits. Critics such as Kenneth Turan, however, said that Burton's innovative, impressive visuals made Batman Returns feel cheerless, claustrophobic and unexciting, and were often emphasized at the expense of the plot. According to Owen Glieberman, Burton's fantastic elements were undermined because he did not establish a base of normality.

The plot had a mixed response. Some reviewers praised the first and second acts and interesting characters who could evoke audience emotion. Others said that it lacked suspense, thrills, or clever writing, overwhelmed by too many characters and near-constant banter. The ending was criticized for lackluster action and failing to bring the separate character threads to a satisfactory conclusion. According to Janet Maslin, Burton cared mainly about visuals and plot was a secondary consideration. Gene Siskel said that the emphasis on characterization was detrimental; the sympathetic villains left him hoping that Batman would not win, and each character would find emotional peace.

Reviewers generally agreed that despite Keaton's abilities, his character was ignored by the script in favor of the villains; scenes without him were among the best. Todd McCarthy described Batman as a symbol of good rather than a psychologically-complete character, and Ebert wrote that Batman Returns depicts being Batman as a curse instead of a heroic power fantasy. Peter Travers, however, said that Keaton's "manic depressive hero" was a deep, realized character in spite of the film's faster pace. DeVito was praised for his energy, unique characterization, and ability to convey his character's tragedy despite the costumes and prosthetics. Desson Howe said that Burton's focus on the Penguin indicated his sympathy for the character. Some reviewers considered DeVito an inferior followup to Nicholson's Joker, who evoked sympathy without instilling fear.

Pfeiffer received near-unanimous praise for the film's standout performance as a passionate, sexy, ambitious, intelligent, intimidating, and fierce embodiment of feminism who offered the only respite from the otherwise-dark tone. Jonathan Rosenbaum, however, said that she did not live up to Nicholson's villain. Turan called the scenes shared by Batman and Catwoman the film's most interesting, and Travers said that when they take off their masks at the end they look "lost and touchingly human." Burr described the ballroom scene (in which they realize each other's secret identities) as more emotional than anything in Batman. Ebert noted that their sexual tension seemed to have been undercut for a younger audience. Walken's performance was described as "wonderfully debonair", funny and engaging, a villain who could have carried Batman Returns alone.

Welch's production design was generally praised, offering a sleeker, brighter, more authoritarian visual style than Furst's "brooding", oppressive aesthetic. McCarthy described Welch's ability to realize Burton's imaginative universe as an achievement, although Gene Siskel described Welch as a "toy shop window decorator" compared to Furst. The costumes and makeup effects were also praised, with Maslin saying that those images would linger in the imagination long after the narrative was forgotten. Czapsky's cinematography was well-received, even giving a "lively" aesthetic to the subterranean sets. The film's violent, mature, sexual content, such as kidnappings and implied child murder, was criticized as inappropriate for younger audiences.

Accolades
At the 46th British Academy Film Awards, Batman Returns was nominated for Best Makeup (Ve Neill and Stan Winston) and Best Special Visual Effects (Michael Fink, Craig Barron, John Bruno, and Dennis Skotak). For the 65th Academy Awards, Batman Returns received two nomations: Best Makeup (Neill, Ronnie Specter, and Winston) and Best Visual Effects (Fink, Barron, Bruno, and Skotak). Neill and Winston received the Best Make-up award at the 19th Saturn Awards. The film received four Saturn Award nominations for Best Fantasy Film, Best Supporting Actor (DeVito), Best Director (Burton), and Best Costume Design (Bob Ringwood, Mary Vogt, and Vin Burnham). DeVito was nominated for Worst Supporting Actor at the 13th Golden Raspberry Awards, and Pfeiffer for Most Desirable Female at the 1993 MTV Movie Awards. Batman Returns was nominated for a Hugo Award for Best Dramatic Presentation.

After release

Performance analysis and aftermath
The U.S. and Canadian box offices underperformed in 1992, with admissions down by up to five percent and about 290million tickets sold (compared to over 300million in each of the preceding four years). Industry professionals blamed the drop on the lack of quality of the films being released, considering them too derivative or dull to attract audiences. Even films considered successful had significant box-office drops week over week from what apparently-negative word of mouth. Industry executive Frank Price said that the releases were not attracting the younger audiences and children which were vital to a film's success. Rising ticket prices, competition from the Olympics, and an economic recession were also considered contributing factors to the declining figures. Batman Returns and Lethal Weapon 3 contributed to Warner Bros. best first half-year in its history, and were expected to return over $200million to the studio from the box office. Batman Returns was considered a disappointment as a sequel to the fifth-highest-grossing film ever made, however, and fell about $114.8million short of Batmans $411.6million theatrical gross. By July 1992, anonymous Warner Bros. executives reportedly said about the film, "It's too dark. It's not a lot of fun."

Despite its PG-13 rating from the Motion Picture Association, warning parents that a film may contain strong content unsuitable for children, some audiences (particularly parents) disliked Batman Returns violent and sexualized content; the studio received thousands of complaint letters. Waters recalled the aftermath of one screening: "It's like kids crying, people acting like they've been punched in the stomach and like they've been mugged." He had anticipated some backlash and "relished that reaction", but part of him was "like, 'oops'." McDonald's was criticized for its child-centered promotion and toys, and discontinued its Batman Returns campaign in September 1992. According to Burton, "I like [Batman Returns] better than the first one. There was this big backlash that it was too dark, but I found this movie much less dark." Although much of Hamm's work was replaced, he defended Burton and Waters and said that except from the merchandise, Batman Returns was never presented as child-friendly.

Warner Bros. decided to continue the series without Burton (described as "too dark and odd for them"), replacing him with Joel Schumacher. A rival studio executive said, "If you bring back Burton and Keaton, you're stuck with their vision. You can't expect Honey, I Shrunk the Batman" (referring to the 1989 science-fiction comedy, Honey, I Shrunk the Kids). Warner Bros. was sued by executive producers Benjamin Melniker and Michael Uslan, who alleged that they had originally purchased the film-adaptation rights to the Batman character but were denied their share of the profits from Batman and Batman Returns by the studio's Hollywood accounting: a method used by studios to artificially inflate a film's production costs, making it appear unprofitable and limiting royalty (or tax) payments. The court decided in the studio's favor, citing a lack of evidence.

Home media 
Batman Returns was released on VHS and LaserDisc on October 21, 1992. Its VHS version had a lower-than-average price, to encourage sales and rentals. The film was expected to sell millions of copies and be a well-performing rental, but its success would be restricted by mature, violent content which would appeal less to children (the main audience driving purchases). Batman Returns was released on DVD in 1997, with no additional features. An anthology DVD box set was released in October 2005, with all the films in the Burton-Schumacher Batman film series. The Batman Returns segment had commentary by Burton, The Bat, The Cat, and The Penguin special about the making of the film, part four of the documentary Shadows of the Bat: The Cinematic Saga of the Dark Knight, notes on the development of costumes, make-up and special effects, and the music video for "Face to Face."

The same anthology was released on Blu-ray in 2009 with a standalone Batman Returns Blu-ray release. A 4K Ultra HD Blu-ray version was released in 2019; restored from the original 35mm negative, it included the anthology's special features. A 4K collector's edition was released in 2022 with a SteelBook case (with original cover art), character cards, a double-sided poster, and previously-released special features. Elfman's score was released in 1992 on compact disc (CD), and an expanded soundtrack was released in 2010.

Other media

About 120 products were marketed with Batman Returns; they included action figures and toys by Kenner Products, Catwoman-themed clothing, toothbrushes, roller skates, T-shirts, underwear, sunglasses, towels, beanbags, mugs, weightlifting gloves, throw pillows, cookie cutters, commemorative coins, playing cards, costume jewelry, cereal, a radio-controlled Batmobile, and tortilla chips shaped like the Batman logo. Although there were about the same number of products marketed for Batman, there were fewer licensees and Warner Bros. could have more oversight. The release of Batman: The Animated Series later in 1992 was anticipated to extend merchandising success long after Batman Returns had left theaters. Warner Bros. used holographic labels developed by American Bank Note Holographics to detect counterfeit products.

The film's novelization, by Craig Shaw Gardner, was published in July 1992. A roller coaster (Batman: The Ride) was built at Six Flags Great America at a cost of $8million, and was later replicated at other Six Flags parks with a Batman stunt show. Several video-game adaptations entitled Batman Returns were released by a number of developers on a number of platforms, including Game Gear, Master System, Sega Genesis, Sega CD, Amiga, MS-DOS, and Atari Lynx; the Super Nintendo Entertainment System version was the most successful.

Batman '89, a comic-book series released in 2022, continues the narrative of Burton's original two films and ignores the Schumacher sequels. Set a few years after the events of Batman Returns, Batman '89 depicts the transformation of district attorney Harvey Dent into Two-Face and introduces Robin. The series was written by Hamm, with art by Joe Quinones. To celebrate the 80th anniversary of the Penguin's first comic-book appearance, DeVito wrote "Bird Cat Love" a 2021 comic book story about the Penguin and Catwoman falling in love and ending the COVID-19 pandemic. The Red Triangle Gang made their first appearance outside Batman Returns in the 2022 comic book Robin #15.

A holiday book was released in 2022, Batman Returns: One Dark Christmas Eve: The Illustrated Holiday Classic, by Ivan Cohen.

Thematic analysis

Duality

Critic David Crow called duality a major aspect of Batman Returns, and Catwoman, Penguin, and Shreck represent warped, reflected aspects of Batman. Like Wayne (Batman), Selina (Catwoman) is driven by trauma and conflicted about her principles and desires; unlike Batman (who seeks justice), however, she seeks vengeance. Although Catwoman agrees with Batman's appeal that they are "the same, split right down the center", they still differ too much to be together. Critics Darren Mooney and Betsy Sharkey suggested that Penguin reflects Batman's origin; each lost their parents at an early age. Shreck says that if not for his abandonment, Cobblepot and Wayne might have traveled in the same social circles. Batman is content in his loneliness, however; the Penguin wants acceptance, love and respect, despite his quest for revenge. To Mooney, Batman Returns hints that Batman's issues with Penguin are personal rather than moral; Batman is quietly proud of being a "freak" (unique), and resents Penguin for displaying his "freakishness". Shreck represents Wayne's public persona if it was driven by greed, vanity, and self-interest: a populist industrialist who wins favor with cheap presents tossed into a crowd.

Commercialism and loneliness
Crow saw Batman Returns as a denouncement of Batman's real-world cultural popularity and merchandising (especially in the wake of the previous film), and noted that a scene of a store filled with Batman merchandise being destroyed was removed from the film. Crow and Mooney wrote that Batman Returns is "saturated with Christmas energy"; it rejects the season's conventional norms and becomes an anti-Christmas film, however, critquing its over-commercialism and lack of true goodwill. Shreck cynically exploits Christmas tropes for his own ends (falsely portraying himself as selfless and benevolent), and the perversions of Penguin's Red Triangle gang are a more overt rejection of the holiday.

The film focuses on loneliness and isolation during Christmastime; Wayne is introduced sitting alone in his vast mansion, inert until the Bat-Signal shines in the sky. He makes a connection with Kyle, but what they share cannot overcome their differences and he ends the film as he began italone. Critic Todd McCarthy identified isolation as a theme common to much of Burton's work, which is emphasized in the three main characters.

Rebecca Roiphe and Daniel Cooper wrote that Batman Returns was not antisemitic, but had antisemitic imagery. The Penguin, they believed, embodied Jewish stereotypes such as "... his hooked nose, pale face and lust for herring" and was "unathletic and seemingly unthreatening but who, in fact, wants to murder every firstborn child of the gentile community." The character joins forces with Shreck (who has a Jewish-sounding name) to disrupt and taint Christmas and Christian traditions.

Sexuality and misogyny
Batman Returns has overtly sexual elements. Critic Tom Breihan described Catwoman's vinyl catsuit as "pure BDSM," including the whip she wields as a weapon. The dialogue is replete with double entendres, particularly by Penguin and Catwoman; in her fights with Batman, she sensuously licks his face. Selina / Catwoman is marginalized by the central male characters, however; Shreck pushes her out of a window, the Penguin tries to kill her when she spurns his advances, and Batman attempts to capture her. She fashions a catsuit to regain order, sanity, and power, but it is gradually damaged over the course of the film and her sanity decays with it. Catwoman's final choice is to reject Batman's offer of a happy ending by 
abandoning her revenge against Shreck; to surrender herself to Batman's will would allow another man to control her.

Power and politics
Power is a central theme for several characters; Shreck says, "There's no such thing as too much power; if my life has a meaning that's the meaning." He uses his money to gain power, and Batman uses his fortune to fund his war against crime (unlike Penguin, who was abandoned because he did not fit the image expected by his wealthy parents). Kyle gains power by donning the Catwoman costume and embracing her anger and sexuality.

Shreck convinces Penguin to run for mayor to further his own goals, and the Penguin seeks out the acceptance and respect it would give him. Critic Caryn James wrote that Batman Returns has "sharp political jabs" which implies that money and image are more important than anything else. In Batman, the Joker buys citizen support by throwing them piles of money; in the sequel, Shreck and Penguin gain the support of the populace with spectacle, pandering, and corporate showmanship. The Penguin describes how he and Shreck are both seen as monsters, but Shreck is a "well-respected monster and I, to date, am not." James said that the Penguin wants to change the superficial perception of himself because he wants to be accepted, but has no interest in being lovable. Only when the fickle voters turn on him, however, does he resort to his plan to kill infants who had the chances he never had. Crow believed that Burton was the most sympathetic to Penguin, and spent the most time on the character.

Legacy

Cultural influence

Retrospectives in the 2010s and 2020s noted that Batman Returns had developed an enduring legacy since its release, with Comic Book Resources describing it as the most iconic comic-book film ever made. Although initially criticized for its mix of the superhero and film noir genres, the film established trends toward dark tones and complex characters which have since become an expectation of many blockbusters. Some writers said that its "disturbing imagery", exploration of morality, and satire of corporate politics seemed even more relevant in the present day, as did the themes of prejudice and feminism explored in Catwoman. Burton said that he believed Batman Returns was exploring new territory at the time, but it might be considered "tame" by modern standards. According to the Ringer, Burton's "weird and unsettling" sequel enabled future auteurs such as Christopher Nolan, Peter Jackson, and Sam Raimi to move into mainstream films.

Collider described the film as the first "anti-blockbuster", defying expectations and delivering a superhero film with little action set during Christmas (despite its July release). Some publications have identified it as part of Burton's unofficial Christmas trilogy, bookended by Edward Scissorhands and The Nightmare Before Christmas, and it has become an alternative-holiday film along with films such as Die Hard (1988). The film's performances, score, and visual aesthetic are considered iconic, influencing Batman-related media and incarnations of the characters for decades (such as the Batman Arkham video games). The Batman (2022) director Matt Reeves and Batman actor Robert Pattinson called Batman Returns their favorite Batman film, with Reeves ranking it alongside The Dark Knight (2008).)

Pfeiffer's Catwoman is considered iconic, a feat of characterization and performance which influenced subsequent female-superhero-led films. Her performance is generally regarded as the best cinematic adaptation of the character (influencing future portrayals such as Zoë Kravitz's in The Batman), one of the best comic book film characters, and among the greatest cinematic villains. In 2022, Variety ranked Pfeiffer's Catwoman as the second-best superhero performance of the preceding fifty years, behind Heath Ledger. DeVito's performance as the Penguin is also considered iconic, and has been listed by some publications as one of the best cinematic Batman villains.

Modern reception
In the years since its release, Batman Returns has been  positively reappraised. It is now regarded as among the best superhero films ever made, the best sequels, and the best Batman films made. Screen Rant called it the best Batman film of the 20th century and, in 2018, GamesRadar+ named it the best Batman film. Batman Returns was number401 on Empires 2008 list of the 500 greatest movies of all time.

Waters recalled being told that Batman Returns was a "great movie for people who don't like Batman". Although the film was criticized for depicting Batman killing people, Waters said, "To me, Batman not killing [the Joker (played by Heath Ledger)] at the end of The Dark Knight after proving he can get out of any prison, it's like 'Come on. Kill Heath Ledger. He believed that the reception to Batman Returns was improving with time, especially after the release of The Batman.

Critic Brian Tallerico said that the elements which originally upset critics and audiences are what makes it still "revelatory... It's one of the best and strangest movies of its kind ever made." According to the website's critical consensus, "Director Tim Burton's dark, brooding atmosphere, Michael Keaton's work as the tormented hero, and the flawless casting of Danny DeVito as The Penguin and Christopher Walken as, well, Christopher Walken make the sequel better than the first." The film has a score of 68 out of 100 on Metacritic (based on 23 critics), indicating "generally favorable reviews".

Sequels

Following the reception of Batman Returns, Warner Bros. intended to continue the series without Burton. Burton recalled, "I remember toying with the idea of doing another one. And I remember going into Warner Bros. and having a meeting. And I'm going, 'I could do this or we could do that.' And they go like, 'Tim, don’t you want to do a smaller movie now? Just something that’s more [you]?' About half an hour into the meeting, I go, 'You don't want me to make another one, do you?'... so, we just stopped it right there." The studio replaced him with Joel Schumacher, who could make something more family- and merchandise-friendly. Although Burton and Keaton were supportive of the new director, Keaton also left the series because "[the film] just wasn't any good, man." Industry press suggested that Keaton had also asked for a $15million salary and a percentage of the profits, although his producing partner Harry Colomby said that money was not an issue.

Burton was an executive producer for the third film, Batman Forever (1995), which had a more mixed reception than Batman Returns but was a financial success. The fourth and final film, Batman & Robin (1997), was a financial and critical failure and is regarded as one of the worst blockbuster films ever made. It stalled the Batman film series for eight years until the reboot, Batman Begins (2005).

By the mid-1990s, Burton and Waters were signed to direct a Catwoman-centered film starring Pfeiffer. Waters' plot depicted Catwoman as an amnesiac after her injuries at the end of Batman Returns, who ends up in the Las Vegas-like Oasisburg and confronts publicly-virtuous male superheroes who are secretly corrupt. Burton and Pfeiffer took on other projects in the interim, and lost interest in the film. Warner Bros. eventually developed Catwoman (2004), starring Halle Berry, which was critically panned and is considered one of the worst comic-book films ever made. 

Keaton was scheduled to reprise his version of Batman in Batgirl, a film scheduled for release in 2022 before its cancellation by Warner Bros. parent company Warner Bros. Discovery. He is scheduled to appear as Batman in The Flash (2023).

References

Notes

Citations

Works cited

External links
  (Warner Bros.)
  (DC Comics)
 
 
 
 
 

1992 films
1990s Christmas films
1990s superhero films

Batman (1989 film series)

American Christmas films
American films about revenge
American neo-noir films
American sequel films
American superhero films

Films about elections
Films adapted into comics
Films directed by Tim Burton
Films produced by Denise Di Novi
Films produced by Tim Burton
Films scored by Danny Elfman
Films set in zoos
Films shot at Pinewood Studios
Films shot in Los Angeles
Films with screenplays by Daniel Waters (screenwriter)
Films with screenplays by Sam Hamm

PolyGram Filmed Entertainment films
Warner Bros. films
1990s English-language films
1990s American films